Vigor High School, located in Prichard, Alabama, is a public high school that educates grades 9-12.  It is operated by the Mobile County Public School System.

It serves most of Prichard.

Dress code
The Mobile County Public School System requires all schools to have a school uniform policy. Shirts allowed include tennis shirts or oxford shirts in hunter green for freshman, sophomores, and juniors; and grey for seniors. Pants must be khaki, and the material must be cotton twill.  Students are allowed to wear tennis shoes of any color. Open-toed shoes are not allowed.

Notable alumni

Willie Anderson (1996); NFL offensive tackle
Robert Brazile – NFL Player
Deshaun Davis - NFL player
Pat Howell, Former MLB player 
Scott Hunter – NFL Player
Ellis Lankster – former NFL Player
Sen'Derrick Marks, NFL defensive tackle
Donald Reese – former NFL Player
Rickey Young – NFL Player
Jalston Fowler - NFL Player

References

External links
 Official website

Public high schools in Alabama
High schools in Mobile County, Alabama
Educational institutions in the United States with year of establishment missing